The Swamp River is a river in Thunder Bay District in Northwestern Ontario, Canada. It is in the Great Lakes Basin and is a tributary of Shebandowan Lakes.

Course
The river begins at an unnamed lake and loops northeast then back south to Swamp Lake. It turns east, then south, then southwest, takes in the left tributary Drift Creek, and heads southeast, parallelled by the Canadian National Railway Kashabowie Subdivision main line, built originally as the Canadian Northern Railway transcontinental main line. It passes into geographic Conacher Township, flows past the railway point of Rossmere, then turns south, passes under the railway and then under Ontario Highway 11, at this point part of the Trans-Canada Highway, and reaches its mouth at Lower Shebandowan Lake, part of the Shebandowan Lakes. The Shebandowan Lakes flow via the Shebandowan River, the Matawin River and the Kaministiquia River to Lake Superior.

Tributaries
Drift Creek (left)

See also
List of rivers of Ontario

References

Sources

Rivers of Thunder Bay District